Scoparia dela is a moth in the family Crambidae. It was described by John Frederick Gates Clarke in 1965. It is found in Chile.

References

Moths described in 1965
Scorparia
Endemic fauna of Chile